Pseudotrochamminita are a genus of multichambered foraminifera, within the order of Lituolida.

Taxonomy
The name Pseudotrochamminita, was derived from the Greek word "pseudos" and the genus Trochamminita, due to its appearance to resemble Trochamminita irregularis.

Specimens
The holotype of P. malcolmi is TF-1678, and the paratypes being TF-1679 and TF-1680.

References

Extant Cambrian first appearances
Globothalamea